Vladimir Vasilyevich Petrenko (: Volodymyr Vasylovych Petrenko, ; born in 1971) is a former competitive figure skater who represented the Soviet Union. He is the 1986 World Junior champion. He is the younger brother of Olympic gold medalist Viktor Petrenko, and they were both coached by Ukrainian figure skating coach Galina Zmievskaya at Spartak in Odessa.

Petrenko currently works as a coach at the International Skating Center (ISCC) in Simsbury, Connecticut. He is an ISU technical specialist for Ukraine. He has two sons, Daniel and Anton Petrenko. Daniel was once a competitive figure skater.

Competitive highlights

References

Navigation

Soviet male single skaters
Ukrainian male single skaters
International Skating Union technical specialists
Living people
World Junior Figure Skating Championships medalists
1971 births
Sportspeople from Odesa
Ukrainian emigrants to the United States
Universiade medalists in figure skating
Universiade bronze medalists for the Soviet Union
Competitors at the 1989 Winter Universiade